Andreas Aubert (3 August 1910 – 11 May 1956) was a Norwegian resistance member during the Second World War. He joined Norwegian Independent Company 1 in 1942 where he later became an ensign.

Aubert was born in Oslo. His older brother, Kristian Aubert (1909-1942), was also an active resistance member during the war but was captured by Gestapo and died of torture in 1942. Aubert was the first prisoner tortured to death by the Germans at Grini. Under the cruel torture he revealed nothing and he thus saved the lives of many he had worked with.

Aubert soon became one of the key members of the sabotage group Oslogjengen, which was under the command of Gunnar Sønsteby. Due to his leadership skills, he was often chosen to perform the most demanding missions carried out by the group.  In early May 1945 Aubert among other members of Oslogjengen secured the archives in the Department of Justice, which revealed the actions the Nazis in Norway during the war.

When the Norwegian Royal Family returned to Norway after the war, Aubert served as a bodyguard.
He received the War Cross with sword, St. Olav's Medal With Oak Branch and the H. M. The King's Commemorative Medal with bar 1940-1945.

After the war Aubert lived a restless and tense life. He died in Oslo in 1956 at the age of 45 and is buried at the Vestre gravlund cemetery.

Sources
Gjems-Onstad, Erik (1995)   Krigskorset og St. Olavsmedaljen med ekegren (Oslo: Grøndahl Dreyer)

External links
 Andreas Aubert - oslogjengen.no (visited 24 October 2010)

1910 births
1956 deaths
Recipients of the St. Olav's Medal with Oak Branch
Norwegian military personnel of World War II
Norwegian resistance members
Norwegian Special Operations Executive personnel
Military personnel from Oslo
Recipients of the War Cross with Sword (Norway)
Burials at Vestre gravlund